The Great Southern Railways Company (often Great Southern Railways, or GSR) was an Irish company that from 1925 until 1945 owned and operated all railways that lay wholly within the Irish Free State (the present-day Republic of Ireland).

The period was difficult with rising operating costs and static to failing income.  The early part of the period was soon after infrastructure losses of the Irish Civil War.  The Emergency or Second World War at the end of the period saw shortages of coal and raw materials with increased freight traffic and restricted passenger traffic.

History

Context
Civil unrest in Ireland had led to the assumption of governmental control of all railways operating in Island of Ireland on 22 December 1916 through the Irish Railways Executive Committee, later succeeded by the Ministry of Transport.  Control was returned to the management of the companies on 15 August 1921.  The Anglo-Irish Treaty of December 1921 establishing the Irish Free State and subsequent Irish Civil War all combined to be damaging to the railways of Ireland widespread and extensive damage to infrastructure and rolling stock.  Between 1916 and 1921 revenues had doubled while operating costs and wages had quadrupled.  When the GS&WR, by far the largest of the companies, announced it would cease operations on 8 January 1923.  The Irish Free state had already recognised the importance of the railway system and had set up the Railway Commission to advise on ownership in April 1922.  The impending collapse led to the process that was to create the GSR.{

Formation
Provision for the creation of the company was made by the Railways Act 1924, which mandated the amalgamation (in the case of the four major railway companies) and absorption (of the 22 smaller companies) of all railways wholly within the Irish Free State. Only cross-border railways, most notably the Great Northern Railway (GNR), remained outside its control.

First amalgamation
The Great Southern and Western Railway Company, the Midland Great Western Railway Company of Ireland and the Cork, Bandon and South Coast Railway Company agreed to terms for amalgamation, forming the Great Southern Railway Company by way of the Railways (Great Southern) Preliminary Amalgamation Scheme of 12 November 1924 (SI no. 31 of that year).

DSER joins
The Great Southern Railways Company was formed when the fourth major company, the Dublin and South Eastern Railway (DSER), joined these companies under the Great Southern Railways Amalgamation Scheme of 1 January 1925 (SI no. 1 of that year) and the Great Southern Railways Supplemental Amalgamation Scheme, also 1925.  The DSER was substantially British owned and had wished to merge with the GNR but was overruled.

Smaller Companies
The smaller companies were absorbed under several successive statutory instruments.

Omissions and Anomalies
CIÉ previously maintained a full online list of the twenty five companies which constituted the Great Southern Railways in 1925.  This is not entirely accurate, as it includes the Fishguard & Rosslare Railways & Harbours Company which still exists today, although GSR took over 50% of its shares upon its creation, the other 50% being held by the UK Great Western Railway. The respective shareholdings in the company, now essentially a shelf company, are held today by Iarnród Éireann and Stena Line.

Two companies that were not amalgamated but whose tracks the GSR retained operating rights over were the City of Dublin Junction Railway, and the New Ross and Waterford Extension.

Early years
The GS&WR was the dominant constituent in terms of area, route millage and rolling stock.  The GSR's headquarters were established at Kingsbridge and Inchicore becoming the chief engineering works.  The former Dublin and South Eastern section in particular had become extremely run down and needed extensive remedial work on its rolling stock with about one third condemned with immediate effect.  Revenue for passengers decreased from £1.91m in 1925 to £1.28m by 1931, that for freight decreasing from £2.27m to £2.05m.

Buses and hotels
From 1929, when it acquired a stake in the Irish Omnibus Company, the company also ran bus services. These operations became the responsibility, from 1 January 1934, of the Great Southern Railways Omnibus Department.

The group owned a number of hotels, and in 1990 the hotel group was transferred from Córas Iompair Éireann to Aer Rianta, in the ownership of which it remained until 2006. The hotel group formed by the company, Great Southern Hotels, continued to bear that name until its privatisation in 2006. Only the Sligo hotel continued to use the Great Southern name as of 2016, but in January 2018 The Malton Hotel in Killarney reverted to its original name of the Great Southern.

1930s
Worldwide economic conditions continued to be difficult and affected Ireland also, passenger and freight revenue decreased to £1.27m and £2.05m by 1939.

Second World War
Although the Republic of Ireland was a neutral country railway transport was severely disrupted by The Emergency. Lack of high quality coal fuel in Ireland and the need to import from England was severe and desperate alternatives such as turf-burning had only extremely limited success. By 1944 most non-suburban passenger services were restricted to Mondays and Thursdays only with some curtailed altogether.

Transfer to CIÉ
The Transport Act 1944 dissolved the company and transferred its assets, together with those of the Dublin United Transport Company to Córas Iompair Éireann, from 1 January 1945.

Route network
Among the few lines closed in the intervening years were the former Midland Great Western lines from Galway to Clifden (in 1935) and from Westport to Achill (in 1937).

Locomotives and rolling stock

Locomotives

A wide variety of locomotives and rolling stock was inherited from the constituent companies.  1925 records show 526 broad and 41 narrow gauge steam locomotives remaining inherited from the originating companies. Locomotives were renumbered into the GSR class number scheme whereby the lowest numbered engine in the class was used as the class identity.  There was a parallel Inchicore scheme that used a letter to indicate the axle layout and a number to designate different groups within the class.

When the GSR passed into CIÉ at the end of 1944 the total number of broad gauge steam locomotives was about 475 of which 58 had been built by GSR.  About 28 narrow gauge steam locomotives remained.

Rolling stock
The total number of passenger vehicles including post office, parcel, and brakes vans was 1670 in 1925, falling to 1337 by 1944.

Railcars
All were withdrawn in the early 1940s. A subsequent order from Claytons in 1928 were less successful and withdrawn in 1932, a model exists in the Fry railway collection. Four Drewry petrol powered railcars of which two were narrow gauge  were also introduced around 1927, with all four also being withdrawn by the mid 1940s. The innovative Drumm Battery Train was successfully operated on the Dublin—Bray route from 1932.

Senior people

General Manager
 C. E. Riley
 W. H. Morton (1932-1942)
 Edgar Craven Bredin (1942—1944)
Chief Mechanical Engineer/Locomotive Superintendent
 J. R. Bazin (1925—1929)
 W. H. Morton (1930—1932)
 A. W. Harty (1932—1937)
 Edgar Craven Bredin (1937—1942)
 J. M. Ginnetty (1942—1944)
 C.F. Tindall (1944)

See also
History of rail transport in Ireland
Rail transport in Ireland
Iarnród Éireann

References

Notes

Footnotes

Sources

External links
 

 
Defunct railway companies of Ireland
Irish gauge railways
Railway companies established in 1924
Railway companies disestablished in 1945
1924 establishments in Ireland
1945 disestablishments in Ireland